Karl-Martin Rammo (born 6 June 1989) is an Estonian sailor, born in Tallinn. He competed at the 2012 Summer Olympics in the Men's Laser class.

At the 2016 Summer Olympics in Rio de Janeiro he competed in the Men's Laser class. He was the flagbearer for Estonia during the Parade of Nations.

References

External links 
 
 
  
 Karl-Martin Rammo in ISAF World Sailing Rankings Progression Fleet racing, Laser Centreboard Boat

1989 births
Living people
Estonian male sailors (sport)
Olympic sailors of Estonia
Sailors at the 2012 Summer Olympics – Laser
Sailors at the 2016 Summer Olympics – Laser
Sailors at the 2020 Summer Olympics – Laser
Sportspeople from Tallinn